"Loyal" is a song by American singer Chris Brown, released as the fourth single from his sixth studio album X (2014). Produced by Nic Nac and Mark Kragen, the song features American rapper Lil Wayne and another rapper depending on the version: French Montana, Too Short and Tyga respectively feature on the East Coast, West Coast, and video/album versions. The song was written by Brown, Wayne, Bobby Brackins and Ty Dolla Sign, as well as different interpolative-credited artists, varying for each respective version. "Loyal" peaked at number nine on the US Billboard Hot 100. It stayed on the chart for 36 weeks. The song was promoted with performances by Brown and Lil Wayne at the BET Awards 2014, Summer Jam, 2014 Soul Train Music Awards, and The Tonight Show Starring Jimmy Fallon.

Background 
On December 16, 2013, the audio to the song was premiered online. The song was originally released in two versions, an East Coast version and a West Coast version. Both versions feature Chris Brown and Lil Wayne; the East Coast version also features French Montana, while the West Coast version features Too Short. Then on December 19, both versions of the song were released as digital downloads. It would be the fourth single released from his sixth studio album X.

The overall theme of the song is about unfaithful women.

Music video 
In February 2014, the music video for "Loyal" was shot at Universal City Walk with Lil Wayne and Tyga, while Brown was in a rehab facility, and they allowed him to leave from 11 to 11 so that he could film the video. On March 21, 2014, Brown announced that the music video would be released on March 24, 2014. Then as planned, it was released that day with a verse from rapper Tyga replacing French Montana or Too Short on the song. Singers Usher, Trey Songz and Ty Dolla Sign make cameo appearances in the video. On August 25, 2020, the video surpassed one billion views on YouTube, becoming Brown's first music video to do so.

As of September 2022, the music video has received over 1.2 billion views and 5 million likes on YouTube.

Live performances
Lil Wayne sang the song with Drake at Summer Jam 2014. Brown performed it live at the BET Awards 2014.

Remixes 
On January 8, 2014, Keyshia Cole released a remix of the song also featuring Sean Kingston, leaving Lil Wayne's original vocals on the song. Also on January 8, Tyga previewed his verse that he recorded for the official remix of the song. Then on March 24, 2014, the remix featuring Tyga and Lil Wayne was released to mainstream urban radio in the United States. A release for digital download followed two days later.

Chart performance
Loyal debuted at number 82 on the US Billboard Hot 100 chart on the week of February 1, 2014. It eventually made its way to the top-ten, peaking at number nine, becoming Brown's 10th top-ten single on the chart. The song spent a total of 36 weeks on the chart. It also peaked at number four on the US Hot R&B/Hip-Hop Songs chart and spent 14 weeks on the chart. As of July 2014, the song has sold a million digital copies in the United States. On November 6, 2017, the single was certified triple platinum by the Recording Industry Association of America (RIAA) for combined sales and streaming equivalent units of over four million units in the United States.

Track listing 

Digital single
"Loyal"  – 4:24
"Loyal"  – 4:24
"Loyal"  – 4:24

Charts

Weekly charts

Year-end charts

Certifications

Radio and release history

References 

2013 songs
2013 singles
Chris Brown songs
Lil Wayne songs
French Montana songs
Too Short songs
RCA Records singles
Tyga songs
Songs written by Nic Nac
Songs written by B.o.B
Songs written by Chris Brown
Songs written by Lil Wayne
Songs written by Sean Combs
Songs written by the Notorious B.I.G.
Songs written by Tyga
Songs written by French Montana
Songs written by Bobby Brackins
Songs written by Ty Dolla Sign
Songs written by Mase